Hardwood Dreams is a 1993 basketball sports documentary written, directed and produced by Michael Tollin and narrated by Wesley Snipes. It follows five Morningside High School (MHS) seniors during their last high school basketball season, as they dream of the National Basketball Association (NBA).

Cast
Morningside High School basketball players
Stais Boseman
Dwight Curry
Dominic Ellison
Sean Harris
Corey Saffold

Awards
The documentary film won the Crystal Heart Award during the Heartland Film Festival in 1993.

Hardwood Dreams: Ten Years Later

A decade later, and in a 2004 TV sequel, Hardwood Dreams: Ten Years Later, Wesley Snipes narrates what happened to the young players who appeared in the original documentary, namely Stais Boseman, Dwight Curry, Dominic Ellison, Sean Harris and Corey Saffold.

References

External links

Hardwood Dreams, Ten Years Later at the Internet Movie Database

1993 films
1993 documentary films
2004 films
2004 documentary films
American basketball films
Documentary films about basketball
Films directed by Michael Tollin
American sports documentary films
High school basketball in the United States
Films set in Los Angeles County, California
Films shot in Los Angeles County, California
Basketball in Los Angeles
2000s English-language films
1990s English-language films
1990s American films
2000s American films
English-language documentary films